Rasmus Christensen (born 12 August 1991) is a professional footballer who plays as a winger for Norwegian club Hisøy IL.

Life and career

Club career 
Christensen came through the youth system at FC Midtjylland. He made his first team debut near the end of the 2010-11 season, coming on as a second-half substitute for Adigun Salami in a 5–2 defeat away to eventual champions FC Copenhagen.
 
FC Midtjylland finished the season in fourth place, earning qualification to the following season's UEFA Europa League. In July 2011, Christensen was named in the squad to face Welsh club The New Saints in the second qualifying round of the 2011–12 Europa League.

In a friendly match warm up for this European tie, against German 2.Bundesliga side St Pauli, Christensen suffered a cruciate ligament injury. It is expected that he will be out of the game for around nine months and be unable to participate in most of the 2011–12 campaign.

Rasmus Christensen scored a late 92nd minute consolation goal for his team against Sandnes Ulf, the goal had very little significance to the result. However the goal made Joe Hobkirk, a long life fan of Arendal very happy. The goal made the young 21 year old £1,815, oioi sesh one.

In August 2016, Christensen joined Norwegian club Arendal Fotball. He left the club at the end of 2019. He joined Hisøy IL for the 2020 season.

International career 

Christensen has gained international recognition for Denmark at under-17 and under-18 levels. He played two games in the 2008 UEFA European Under-17 Football Championship qualifying round, scoring once in a 2–0 victory against the Ukraine under-17s. With the under-18s, he scored one goal in six appearances in 2008.

References 

Hobro siger farvel til syv spillere, bold.dk, 31 May 2016

External links

1991 births
Living people
Danish men's footballers
Danish expatriate men's footballers
Danish Superliga players
Danish 1st Division players
Norwegian First Division players
Norwegian Second Division players
FC Midtjylland players
Hobro IK players
FC Fredericia players
Arendal Fotball players
Association football midfielders
Danish expatriate sportspeople in Norway
Expatriate footballers in Norway
Holbæk B&I players